This is a list of Belgian European Film Award winners and nominees. This list details the performances of Belgian actors, actresses, and films that have either been submitted or nominated for, or have won, a European Film Award.

Categories

Best Film

Best Comedy

European Discovery of the Year

Best Animated Feature Film

Best Short Film

Best Documentary

Best Director

Best Actor

Best Actress

Best Composer

Best Screenwriter

Best Cinematographer

Best European Co-Producer

People's Choice Award for Best European Film

Young Audience Award

European University Film Award

See also
 List of Belgian submissions for the Academy Award for Best International Feature Film

References

External links
 Nominees and winners at the European Film Academy website

Belgium
European Film Awards
European Film Awards